A higher diploma is an academic award in Iraq, Libya, the United Kingdom, Hong Kong, Ireland and Oman. In Iraq, it's one year after bachelor's degree (i.e., not equivalent to a bachelor's degree). In Ireland it is a postgraduate qualification at the same level as the honours bachelor's degree. In the United Kingdom, the diploma is equivalent to higher tier (A*-C) GCSE.

Iraq
A postgraduate university program is the 2-Terms Diploma (Arabic: دبلوم عالي ) course. The first year is made up of higher coursework, and students write a thesis after the 2 terms. The entrance requirement for this programme is a pass mark (50-59%) for the bachelor's degree in the same discipline.

In terms of level, the Post graduate Diploma (Arabic: دبلوم عالي ) is comparable to a 1-year WO master's degree in a similar specialization in the Netherlands.
In medical field high diploma is two years full-time training and passing rank is 70%

Libya
The Higher Diploma AKA High Diploma (Arabic:  دبلوم عالي) in Libya is an award from a national institute of technology or engineering given to the students who fulfil the requirement of passing 120 to 140 academic credits, it was started in 1980s by ministry of higher education as a degree with emphasis on the practical studies that benefits the local market comparing to the "theoretical approach" was taken by the universities (Higher diploma is a degree in higher education). Importantly, the degree may equivalent to BSc, or three-years undergraduate degree, students with Higher Diploma may take additional academic courses (two full-time semesters) in order to get bachelor's degree, as clearly stated in the law of higher education in Libya.

Recently, the government has issued a law in which the institutes of higher education will change into Colleges of Higher Education and to change the degree that given by them to bachelor's degree, in order to meet the world standards.

United Kingdom

In the UK, the higher diploma is a level 2 qualification on the Regulated Qualifications Framework, following the recently introduced 14- to 19-year-old Diploma system for the UK, which follows two levels, lower tier (Level 1) and higher tier (Level 2). To proceed to A-Levels in England, Northern Ireland, and Wales; you have to have completed a specified amount of qualifications at-least equivalent to A*-C GCSE (Level 2).

The higher diploma program usually consists of four major subjects: Maths, English, ICT, and a subject you want to study more in-depth.

Hong Kong

A higher diploma is an academic award by a university, college, other tertiary institutions, or post-secondary institutions. The award is at the same level as an associate degree or diploma/advanced diploma qualifications framework Level 4, but below the standard of a bachelor's degree. It is also above a lower-level certificate; and lower-level diploma.

Usually higher diplomas emphasis more on specialization and job training whereas associate degrees focus more on general, broader education. For example, there may be a higher diploma for "electrical engineering" but only an associate degree for "physical science".

Ireland

The Higher Diploma (Ard-Dioplóma in Irish) is an award from Quality and Qualifications Ireland which in 2012 took over responsibilities  from the Higher Education and Training Awards Council that replaces the graduate diploma in Ireland. The higher diploma is currently available in universities in Ireland ; the standard of the award is broadly similar to the graduate diploma, and replaces reorientation-type courses. Professional-type graduate diplomas will be replaced by postgraduate diplomas.

The National University of Ireland also offers a broad selection of higher diplomas in its constituent universities and recognized colleges. Main disciples are arts, business, engineering and science. A higher diploma in education is offered by the University of Dublin.

Oman
The Higher Diploma is an award equivalent to fourth or third year of bachelor's degree, it's a one-year course with 30 credit hours after achieving the diploma.

See also
Diploma
Professional certification
National Qualifications Framework

References

Qualifications